Çarşaf was a Turkish language humor magazine which was in circulation in the period 1975–1992. The magazine was based in Istanbul, Turkey.

History and profile
Çarşaf was first published on 17 December 1975. The magazine followed the tradition of other humor magazines such as Akbaba and Gırgır. Çarşaf managed to reach higher levels of circulation, but folded in 1992. The last four issues of the magazine were published as a supplement of daily newspaper Hürriyet, and the final issue was dated 2 April 1992.

References

External links

1975 establishments in Turkey
1992 disestablishments in Turkey
Defunct magazines published in Turkey
Magazines established in 1975
Magazines disestablished in 1992
Satirical magazines published in Turkey
Turkish-language magazines
Turkish political satire
Newspaper supplements
Magazines published in Istanbul